Fabrice Bollon (born Paris, 1965) is a French conductor and composer.

Biography
Bollon studied with Michael Gielen and Nikolaus Harnoncourt in Paris and at the Mozarteum in Salzburg. He subsequently continued his studies with Georges Prêtre and Mauricio Kagel.

In 2008, Bollon was appointed musical director of the Freiburg Opera. Under Bollon, the Freiburg Opera has recorded a series of lesser known operas for CPO, including Riccardo Zandonai's Francesca Da Rimini, Francesco Cilea's L'Arlesiana, and Karl Goldmark's Die Königin von Saba. 

In May 2022, the Staatskapelle Halle announced the appointment of Bollon as its next GMD, effective with the 2022-2023 season, with an initial contract of 5 years.

References

External links
 Official homepage of Fabrice Bollon
 Konzertdirektion Martin Muller agency page on Fabrice Bollon

 

1965 births
Living people
French male conductors (music)
21st-century French conductors (music)
21st-century French male musicians